The 1972 Charlotte Tennis Classic, also known by its sponsored name North Carolina National Bank Tennis Classic,  was a men's tennis tournament played on outdoor clay courts that was part of the World Championship Tennis (WCT) circuit. It was the second edition of the tournament and was held from April 18 through April 23, 1972 at the Julian J. Clark Tennis Stadium, owned by the Olde Providence Racquet Club in Charlotte, North Carolina in the United States. Second-seeded Ken Rosewall won the singles title.

Finals

Singles

 Ken Rosewall defeated  Cliff Richey 2–6, 6–2, 6–2

Doubles

 Tom Okker /  Marty Riessen defeated  John Newcombe /  Tony Roche 6–4, 4–6, 7–6

References

External links
 ITF tournament edition details

Charlotte Tennis Classic
Charlotte Tennis Classic
Charlotte Tennis Classic
Charlotte Tennis Classic